Marzellous Douglas "Alphonso" Cox (March 14, 1908 – July 1964) was an American Negro league pitcher in the 1930s and 1940s.

A native of Fort Myers, Florida, Cox made his Negro leagues debut in 1930 with the Lincoln Giants. He went on to play for the Jacksonville Red Caps and the Philadelphia Stars. Cox died in 1964 at age 56.

References

External links
 and Seamheads

1908 births
1964 deaths
Date of death missing
Place of death missing
Lincoln Giants players
Jacksonville Red Caps players
Philadelphia Stars players
Baseball pitchers
Baseball players from Florida
Sportspeople from Fort Myers, Florida